J. Carroll Johnson (November 9, 1882 – May 4, 1967) was an architect in South Carolina. He was the first resident architect at University of South Carolina and supervised campus expansion. He designed numerous residences in Columbia's suburbs during the roaring 1920s. His work also includes the Lexington County Courthouse which is listed on the National Register of Historic Places.

He was born in Kristianstad, Sweden. He is buried at Elmwood Cemetery.

The Library of Congress has photographs of some of his buildings including from the Historic American Buildings Survey (catalogued along with musical documents from minstrel performer Carroll Johnson).

Work
State Industrial School for Girls (1918)
First Presbyterian Church of Kershaw, South Carolina (1920), 
Three schools in Lancaster, South Carolina (1922)
Buildings on the University of South Carolina campus including:
 Sloan College (1927) 
South Caroliniana Library wing additions (1927–1928)
Melton Observatory (1928)
Wardlaw College (1930–1931)
Sims Dormitory (1939)
Petigru College (1949) with Simons & Lapham of Charleston
LeConte College (1952)
Osborne Administration Building (1951 – 1952)
President’s House (1952), conversion and renovation
Lexington County Courthouse (1939 – 1940) with Jesse W. Wessinger  in Lexington, South Carolina
 First Baptist Church of West Columbia (1942)

Residential buildings
Benjamin F. Taylor House (1910 – 1912)
Boyne-Pressley-Spigner House (1915)
 Two houses for Dr. Robert E. Seibels in Columbia (1927 and 1933)
John T. Stevens House in Kershaw (1918)
James L. Coker, Jr. house (1923 – 1924) 
 J. B. Gilbert house (1929)
102 South Driftwood Drive in Columbia

Further reading
“Dialogue With The Past’–J. Carroll Johnson, Architect, and the University of South Carolina, 1912–1956” Master’s thesis by Andrew Watson Chandler, University of South Carolina (1993)
“John C. Johnson, 84, Architect, Dies” Columbia State, May 5, 1967, page A7
The South Carolina Architects, 1885–1935: A Biographical Directory by John E. Wells and Robert E. Dalton, New South Architectural Press, Richmond, Virginia (1992)

References

1882 births
1967 deaths
University of South Carolina people
People from Kristianstad Municipality
20th-century American architects
Architects from South Carolina
Swedish emigrants to the United States